There are six municipalities in Mexico named Emiliano Zapata, after the revolutionary leader of that name:
 Emiliano Zapata, Chiapas
 Emiliano Zapata, Hidalgo
 Emiliano Zapata, Morelos
 Emiliano Zapata Municipality, Tabasco
 Emiliano Zapata Municipality, Tlaxcala
 Emiliano Zapata Municipality, Veracruz

Municipality name disambiguation pages